5th National Board of Review Awards
December 29, 1933
The 5th National Board of Review Awards were announced on December 29, 1933.

Top Ten Films 
Topaze
Berkeley Square
Cavalcade
Little Women
Mama Loves Papa
The Pied Piper
She Done Him Wrong
State Fair
Three-Cornered Moon
Zoo in Budapest

Top Foreign Films 
Hertha's Erwachen
Ivan
M
Morgenrot
Poil de carotte
The Private Life of Henry VIII
Quatorze Juillet
Rome Express
The Blood of a Poet

Winners 
Best Film: Topaze
Best Foreign Film: Hertha's Erwachen

External links 
National Board of Review of Motion Pictures :: Awards for 1933

1933
1933 film awards
1933 in American cinema